Marco Zanotti (born 21 January 1974 in Rovato) is a road bicycle racer from Italy, who was a professional rider from 1997 to 2008, with the exception of the year 1999. Zanotti most recently rodes for the UCI Professional Continental team Preti Mangimi.

References
 

Italian male cyclists
1974 births
Living people
Cyclists from the Province of Brescia